Adi 'Abd al-Majid ibn al-Marhum Panembahan Ismail, Panembahan Kusuma Negara III (b.? – d. after 1913) was the Panembahan (in full Sri Paduka Tuanku Gusti Adi 'Abd al-Majid Panembahan) of the Sintang traditional state 1905 – 1913. He was born as Ade Usman, the son of his predecessor Sri Paduka Tuanku Ismail, Panembahan Kusuma Negara II Panembahan of Sintang. His mother was his father's first wife Dayang Zainab, Ratu Permaisuri. His father soon appointed him as heir apparent (full original title Gusti Adi 'Abd al-Majid, Pangeran Ratu Adipati Kusuma Negara). Assuming the throne following the death of his father on 22 December 1905, Usman was suspended from ruling in 1912 by the Netherlands East Indies authorities and was deposed by them on 16 January 1913 for "bad behaivour" and exiled to Bogor in Java. He died on Java after that date.

Indonesian monarchs